Melike Günal (born 5 April 1998) is a Turkish weightlifter competing in the women's +87 kg division. She is a member of ASKİ Spor in Ankara.

Early life
Melike Günal was born in Kahramanmaraş, southeastern Turkey on 5 April 1998.  She studied Physical Education at Adıyaman University.

She initially began with wrestling sport. During her trtrainings for wrestling in Kahramanmaraş, she lifted weights in order to be stronger. With the encouragement of her coach, she switched over to weightlifting, and became several times Turkish champion.

Major results
Günal took three bronze medals in the +90 kg event at the 2018 European Junior & U23 Weightlifting Championships held in Zamość, Poland. In 2019, she became three times gold medalist at the European Junior & U23 Championships in Bucharest, Romania. She took three gold medals in the +87 kg division at the 6th International Solidarity Championships in Tashkent, Uzbekistan. She won three bronze medals at the 2021 European Weightlifting Championships held in Moscow, Russia, in the +87 kghe Snatch and Clean and jerk events, taking the bronze medal in the total. She is the Turkish record holder in +87 kg Snatch (108 kg), Clean & Jerk (135) and total (243 kg).

At the 2021 European Junior & U23 Weightlifting Championships in Rovaniemi, Finland, she won the bronze medal in her event.

She won the silver medal in her event at the 2022 European Weightlifting Championships held in Tirana, Albania.

References

1998 births
Living people
Sportspeople from Kahramanmaraş
Turkish female weightlifters
21st-century Turkish sportswomen